Chitpanya Tisud (born 8 February 1991), simply known as Nhong, is a Thai professional footballer who plays as an attacking midfielder for Thai League 2 club Nakhon Si United.

Club career

Buriram United
June 2016, Chitpanya Tisud moved from Chainat Hornbill to Buriram United in the second leg of 2016 season.

Honours

Club
PT Prachuap
 Thai League Cup (1) : 2019

Uthai Thani
Thai League 3 (1): 2021–22
Thai League 3 Northern Region (1): 2021–22

References

External links
 

1994 births
Living people
Chitpanya Tisud
Chitpanya Tisud
Association football midfielders
Chitpanya Tisud
Chitpanya Tisud
Chitpanya Tisud
Chitpanya Tisud
Nakhon Si United F.C. players